The Observer, established in 1896, is a newspaper that serves Union and Wallowa counties in the U.S. state of Oregon.  Its headquarters are in La Grande, the seat of Union County. The Observer circulates Monday, Wednesday and Friday afternoons to more than 10,000 people.  EO Media Group based in Salem, Oregon, publishes the newspaper.

Staff and management
The Observer management team includes Publisher Karrine Brogoitti and Regional Editorial Director Andrew Cutler. The Observer has 13 employees.

History

In 2012, the newspaper reduced its frequency from five days a week to three days a week, publishing issues on Mondays, Wednesdays and Fridays. In June 2019, EO Media Group purchased The Observer and Baker City Herald after Western Communications Inc. filed for Chapter 11 bankruptcy protection in January. Lawyers for Western Communications told the bankruptcy court the plan was to sell the property and buildings, according to court records. Earlier in 2019, the motor failed on the 53-year-old press that had long printed The Observer and Baker City Herald and the two newspapers had to be printed on the East Oregonian’s press in Pendleton.

References

La Grande, Oregon
1896 establishments in Oregon
Newspapers published in Oregon
Oregon Newspaper Publishers Association
Newspapers established in 1896
Union County, Oregon
Wallowa County, Oregon